Hanussen is a 1955 West German drama film directed by O. W. Fischer and Georg Marischka and starring Fischer, Liselotte Pulver and Siegfried Lowitz.  It was shot at the Bavaria Studios in Munich. The film's sets were designed by the art directors Robert Herlth and Hermann Warm.

Cast
 O. W. Fischer as Erik Jan Hanussen
 Liselotte Pulver as Hilde Graf
 Theodor Danegger
 Maria Dominique as Grace Coligny
 Werner Finck as Der Sachverständige
 Klaus Kinski as Erik von Spazier a.k.a. Mirko
 Reinhard Kolldehoff as Biberger
 Rolf Kralovitz
 Walter Ladengast
 Margrit Läubli as Tanzgirl
 Ludwig Linkmann as Herr Scholz
 Siegfried Lowitz as Prosecutor
 Erni Mangold as Priscilla Pletzak
 Franz Muxeneder as Jaroslav Huber
 Helmut Qualtinger as Ernst Röhm
 Kai-Siegfried Seefeld (as Kai S. Seefeld)
 Hermann Speelmans as Maus
 Wastl Witt as Leopold Ebenseder

References

Bibliography
 Bock, Hans-Michael & Bergfelder, Tim. The Concise CineGraph. Encyclopedia of German Cinema. Berghahn Books, 2009.

External links

1955 films
1955 drama films
German drama films
West German films
1950s German-language films
Films set in 1931
Films set in 1932
Films set in 1933
German black-and-white films
Films directed by O. W. Fischer
Films directed by Georg Marischka
Films about magic and magicians
Films shot at Bavaria Studios
1950s German films